Allsvenskan 1926–27, part of the 1926–27 Swedish football season, was the third Allsvenskan season played. The first match was played 1 August 1926 and the last match was played 6 June 1927. GAIS won the league ahead of runners-up IFK Göteborg, while Westermalms IF and IFK Uddevalla were relegated.

Participating clubs

League table

Promotions, relegations and qualifications

Results

Attendances

Top scorers

References 

Print

Online

Allsvenskan seasons
1926–27 in Swedish association football leagues
Sweden